Isho, sometimes stylized in capital letters as ISHO is the name of a mixed-use development edge city located in Timișoara, Romania. The project was conceived from the beginning to integrate residential complex, hotel, retail and entertainment functions. The mixed project includes, in addition to the previous facilities a  park, event rooms, offices, a multistorey car park and an expo pavilion. The complex is the home of the tallest residential buildings in Timisoara (Tower Riverside A – 75 m and Tower Parkside D – 70 m).

History
The current complex was built on vacant land which belonged to old wool factory of "ILSA" until 2012. Romanian businessman Ovidiu Şandor established a new urban center concept which would include facilities to allow gradual development for the area. The office component was designed for a phased development, in three phases. The project attracted important companies from fields such as automotive, IT&tech and services. Various have either expanded their presence in the western part of the country or opened new offices in the complex area. Tenants include Visteon, Bosch, Deloitte, NetRom Software. As of late 2022, Japanese corporation Omron was set to rent working spaces.

Architecture

Concept
The management of the complex knot of fluxes, connections, thoroughfares, viewing directions and panoramas, influenced the planning strategy, the architectural design, the inner landscaping. The main strategy was to divide the site into three east–west strips along the boulevard, along the riverbank and in-between along the future eastern connection. The northern strip will contain massive and iconic buildings (class A offices, hotels, high-rise apartment buildings), consistent with enhancing the boulevard image as a thoroughfare. The southern edge will contain several U-shaped apartment buildings, offering multiple views to the riverbank and traditional districts across the river, and a high-rise, offering an iconic tower. The middle strip contains an inner plaza, defined by the S shaped office building and a green square between the northern and southern rows of buildings. The design of the public spaces with a unique parametric landscaped pattern varies from mineral until green, from public plaza or green square to semi-private inner atriums of the U-shaped buildings.

Buildings

The complex is set to include a total of nine buildings. Six residential, one for office suites, a hotel and a multistorey car park. As of February 2023, four of the residential buildings, the car park and the office building are completed. In 2021, a boulevard was built across the complex area and was set to become part of the main circulation arteries of the town.

Beyond apartments and new generation offices, the complex provides a conference center and a hub-type co-working space. It serves a total of 2,000 parking spaces, a gym, spa, swimming pool and a park of over 7,500 square meters, with a running track. It will also provide the development of some playgrounds, will be served by an after-school, but also by several well-rated schools and kindergartens, located in the vicinity. The project is complemented by a supermarket, medical center, pharmacy, banks and other complementary commercial functions. Last but not least, the pedestrian area of the complex will offer restaurants, cafes, terraces and other spaces for socializing and relaxing.

See also
List of tallest buildings in Romania

External links
ISHO Site
ADN Architectura
Andreescu & Gaivoronschi Associate Architects

References

Edge cities in Romania